U.S. State Nonresident Withholding Tax is a mandatory prepayment of tax of individuals or entities that are not resident in the state. A common example of this is the taxation of oil and natural gas royalty interest revenue. In order to ensure that the state receives a portion of the revenue from oil and gas leases within the state, any payments made to an address outside of the state require that a tax be withheld and paid directly to the state.

States that have enacted such laws include, but are not limited to:
 Georgia
 Oklahoma
 New Mexico
 Utah
 California
 Oregon
 Montana
 North Carolina
 Wisconsin

A majority of states with income taxes impose similar requirements on partnerships (including LLCs) and S corporations with nonresident partners or shareholders. All states with income taxes impose a similar withholding obligation on wages paid to nonresidents by businesses operating within the state.

The taxes withheld must be treated as prepaid taxes, with final taxes imposed at the same rate and under the same computations for residents and nonresidents.

Sample of external links
 Georgia Department of Revenue - Withholding
 Oklahoma tax form for reporting
 Oregon nonresident withholding on certain real estate transactions

References 

State taxation in the United States
Withholding taxes